The 1991 430 km of Autopolis was the eighth and final round of the 1991 World Sportscar Championship season, taking place at Autopolis, Japan.  It took place on October 28, 1991.

Official results
Class winners in bold.  Cars failing to complete 90% of the winner's distance marked as Not Classified (NC).

Statistics
 Pole Position - Teo Fabi (#4 Silk Cut Jaguar) - 1:27.188
 Fastest Lap - Yannick Dalmas (#6 Peugeot Talbot Sport) - 1:30.615
 Average Speed - 177.891 km/h

External links
 WSPR-Racing - 1991 Autopolis results

Autopolis
Autopolis